The Battle of Sarhū (薩爾滸之戰; 萨尔浒之战; Sà'ěrhǔ zhī zhàn) refers to a series of battles between the Later Jin dynasty (the predecessor of the Qing dynasty) and the Ming dynasty and their Joseon allies in the winter of 1619. The battle is notable for the heavy use of cavalry by the Later Jin in defeating Ming and Joseon forces equipped with hand cannons, cannons, and matchlocks.

Background 
Prior to the battle Nurhaci had unified the Jurchen people, excluding the Yehe, and took a hostile attitude towards the Ming for favoritism and meddling in the affairs of the Jurchen tribes. In 1618, he proclaimed his Seven Grievances (nadan amba koro 七大恨) with the Ming to Heaven and subsequently declared war on the Ming. He occupied Fushun, Qinghe (清河), and other cities before retreating. The death of the Ming Vice-General Zhang Chengyin (張承蔭) during the Battle of Fushun stunned the Ming court. In 1619, he attacked the Yehe (葉赫) in an attempt to provoke the Ming. The Ming responded by dispatching expeditionary forces led by Military Commissioner Yang Hao to besiege the Later Jin capital Hetu Ala from four routes.

Organization

Course of battle

Western Route 
Du Song's forces set off west from Shenyang on the night of the 29th of the 2nd lunar month under torchlight. He had orders to arrive at Yagu Gate on the 2nd of the 3rd lunar month, so he arrived the next day at Fushun, 100 li (里) away, and captured the undefended city. Du's army was delayed by snow and stayed at Fushun for some time, but Du grew impatient and set forth with his army after 10 days despite the unfavorable conditions.

When they arrived at the Hun River, the Jin had already set up defenses on the other side of the river. Du Song was advised to camp for the night, but he refused and took 10,000 men with him across the river to attack Jin defenses, while leaving 20,000 with the artillery train and baggage on the other side. One source accuses him of drunkenness having clouded his judgment that night. He was asked to wear armor prior to the crossing, but he replied that being in the military for this many years, he did not know how heavy armor was as he never wore it, and crossed the river. When his forces were halfway across, Nurhaci ordered his bannermen to break the dams they had prepared and Du's men had to abandon their equipment to escape the current. The commander in charge of artillery and baggage was supposed to coordinate the crossing following Du, but he refused due to the river's turbulence.

That night, Du Song divided his forces into two camps, one at Sarhu Mountain Pass and one at Jilin Cliff where he camped. Nurhaci sent his sons Hong Taiji and Daišan with a banner each to keep Du Song occupied at Jilin Cliff and he himself took six banners and attacked the Sarhu camp.

The Sarhu camp held off the initial Jin assault but fell into an ambush while in pursuit of the enemy and were driven toward the river. Ming musketeers tried to reform ranks and fire their guns but were flanked by Jin cavalry which broke their formation and shattered their morale.

Nurhaci then concentrated all his forces against Du's camp and laid siege to it. Du's forces were completely surrounded and their firearms only made their location more evident to their enemies. Du and the other two generals, Wang Xuan and Zhao Menglin, were killed in combat while trying to occupy a high ground near the river. Du Song died from an arrow supposedly fired by Laimbu, 13th son of Nurhaci. The Jin chased the shattered Ming remnants for 20 li before regrouping to form ranks. Then they headed off to confront Ma Lin's forces at Xiangjiayan.

Northern Route 
Upon receiving news of the Western Route's demise, Ma Lin grew more cautious. He divided his forces in two and together with the remnants of Du Song's army, mainly supply units, formed three fortified camps at Xiangjiayan (Siyanggiyan), protected by cannons and trenches.

Nurhaci concentrated his forces on Ma Lin's own camp. He first sent a contingent of horsemen to scout out their defenses. Then he ordered a thousand infantry to draw fire while Nurhaci led his banners to surround the Ming encampment and conduct a surprise attack. Nurhaci's banners were so rapid that Ma's gunners could only get off one volley before the Jin were upon them. Ming forces panicked and were cut down by Jin cavalry. The rearguard attempted to rally under Pan Zongyan and his Yihe (Jurchen) allies, but this proved futile, and the army's morale broke. Ma Lin escaped as half of his troops were killed or captured. The other two camps also fell in quick succession.

Eastern Route 
Yang Hao issued commands to retreat and regroup, but Liu Ting never received the message.

Nurhaci and Daišan returned to Hetu Ala with 4,000 troops to recuperate.

The Jin decided to attack Liu Ting next, as Li Rubai's forces were mainly traversing mountain paths. Unlike Du Song and Ma Lin, Liu had experienced some small success in defeating advance Jin scouts, resulting in the capture of three fortresses, the death of two Jin generals, as well as 3,000 casualties on the Jin side.

Before he left, Nurhaci ordered some of his troops to disguise themselves as Ming soldiers and mix into Liu Ting's entourage. His spies posed as Du Song's messengers and delivered a false letter to Liu Ting stating that Du Song was already fast approaching Hetu Ala, requesting him to speed up. Liu took the bait and increased the army's pace which caused his troops to lose cohesion as they advanced deep into a valley.

Liu Ting was ambushed in Abudali (阿布達里) Pass, not 60 li away from Hetu Ala, as his troops stretched themselves out to traverse the valley. His forces met Daišan's assault and withstood the first charge, but was shattered in the second charge by Hong Taiji, whose banner inflicted heavy casualties as approximately 3,000 Zhejiang troops and more than 7,000 Hmong troops were killed. Liu Ting died in combat after personally killing several Jin soldiers.

The Joseon force of 10,000 musketeers and 3,000 archers were hindered by the harsh wind. Joseon archers fired volleys without arrowheads because they had not intended to fight the Jin in the first place and wished to maintain a neutral policy between the Later Jin and the Ming. The musketeers however performed admirably and fought until their allies surrendered. Their fortitude was regarded with admiration by the future Qing emperor Hong Taiji. Joseon contingent commander Gang Hong-rip then surrendered with his remaining troops.

Southern Route 
Li Rubai received orders to retreat and withdrew his troop across Ming borders without any casualties. However, after the Ming lost the battle, Li Rubai committed suicide.

Aftermath
Yang Hao was arrested by the Embroidered Uniform Guard and imprisoned for 10 years before he was executed by Zhu Youjian.

Li Rubai was impeached on the basis of his personal relationship with Nurhaci. He committed suicide before his trial.

Ma Lin retreated to Kaiyuan, where he was captured and killed by the Later Jin when they conquered the city a few months later.

After returning to Hetu Ala, Nurhaci celebrated with his retainers. Thereafter, he sent a messenger to the King of Joseon asking why they had aided the Ming and aired his grievances towards them. Not willing to anger Nurhaci, Joseon returned a letter congratulating him on his victory, but remained ambivalent in official communications with the Later Jin, nor did Joseon recognize his regime.

Two-thirds of the 13,000 Joseon Expeditionary Force were killed, but those who survived as captives were released and allowed to return to their homeland. Gang Hong-rip however was kept for his proficiency in the Jurchen language. Later on Gang would be led to believe that his family had died in the political turmoil that occurred during a coup in his native kingdom of Joseon. To exact his revenge on the Joseon court, he urged the Jin to invade Joseon, which led to the First Manchu invasion of Korea in 1627. Only during the peace negotiations did he find out that he had been misled.

The Joseon musketeers being overwhelmed by the Manchu cavalry prompted a revision of military tactics in Korea. In previous decades, the Imjin War was seen as a demonstration of the dominance of the firearm, and the Joseon adjusted military forces accordingly. Both sides of the war lacked effective shock cavalry to take advantage of the vulnerabilities of unsupported musketeers. After the defeat at Sarhū, the Joseon forces revised their doctrine to have spearmen supporting the musketeers. The new Korean force was tested against the Manchus again in 1627 and 1636-1637. Both times, they were defeated, but their performance left a strong impression on the Manchus. The first emperor of the newly declared Qing dynasty later wrote: "The Koreans are incapable on horseback but do not transgress the principles of the military arts. They excel at infantry fighting."

Gallery

See also
Timeline of the Ming dynasty
Timeline of the Qing dynasty

References

Bibliography

1619 in China
Sarhu 1619
Sarhu 1619
Sarhu 1619
Military history of Liaoning
Fushun